The Suva Fiji Temple is the 91st operating temple of the Church of Jesus Christ of Latter-day Saints (LDS Church).

The LDS Church in Fiji
The first missionaries visited Fiji in 1953. The first recorded meeting of the Church was held July 25, 1954, in the Matanisiga Hall in Toorak, Suva. After visiting the island in 1955, church president David O. McKay, opened the first LDS branch in Fiji, calling missionaries to increase outreach to Fijians and Indians. In 1975, The Church of Jesus Christ of Latter-day Saints Fiji Technical College was opened. The first Stake in Fiji, the Suva Fiji Stake was organized 12 June 1983, with Inosi Naga as president. Stakes were created in Viti Levu and Districts in Vanua Levu and Taveuni due to congregation and membership expansion.  The number of congregations increased rapidly in the 1990s form 19 to 41.

History
On May 7, 1998 the LDS Church First Presidency announced plans to build a temple in Suva, Fiji.

A ground-breaking ceremony were held for the Suva Fiji Temple on May 8, 1999. Earl M. Monson, a member of the Second Quorum of the Seventy, presided at the ceremony. The Pacific Ocean can be seen from three sides of the property on one of the tallest hills in the area, and the site is located just a few minutes away from downtown Suva. The exterior of the temple is finished with Snow-white granite from Campolonghi, Italy and the grounds are beautifully landscaped.

The temple was open for public tours from June 7 to 12, 2000. Just before the open house, starting on May 19, political unrest occurred in Fiji. A group of armed rebels held a group of government leaders hostage in Suva for weeks. Those held hostage included the Prime Minister of Fiji at the time, Mahendra Chaudhry. The situation was so intense that the church decided to send all of the Mormon missionaries in the area to the other side of the island to avoid any dangerous situations. Despite these problems and little media attention over 16,000 people toured the temple including 300 community leaders. Those who toured the temple were able to see the two ordinance rooms, two sealing rooms, Celestial room, baptistery, and learn more about Mormon beliefs associated with the temple.

The Suva Fiji Temple was dedicated on June 18, 2000 by LDS Church president Gordon B. Hinckley. Because of the 2000 Fijian coup d'état, which had been occurring since before the open house, it was decided that a small dedication service would be best and the normal four dedicatory services were abandoned. Sixty people attended the dedication, which was held in the Celestial room of the temple.

Renovations
The temple closed October 13, 2014 for renovations that included improving air conditioning and adding new finishes inside the building. After renovations were completed, a public open house was held from Monday, 25 January 2016, through Saturday, 6 February 2016, excluding Sunday, 31 January. The temple was rededicated by Henry B. Eyring on Sunday, February 21, 2016. The temple was rededicated the day after landfall of Cyclone Winston, the strongest tropical cyclone ever recorded in Fiji. The cyclone forced changes to the cultural celebration held the day prior to the rededication.

See also

 The Church of Jesus Christ of Latter-day Saints in Fiji
 List of temples of The Church of Jesus Christ of Latter-day Saints
 List of temples of The Church of Jesus Christ of Latter-day Saints by geographic region
 Temple architecture (LDS Church)

References

External links
 
Suva Fiji Temple Official site
Suva Fiji Temple at ChurchofJesusChristTemples.org

20th-century Latter Day Saint temples
Religious buildings and structures in Fiji
Temples (LDS Church) completed in 2000
Buildings and structures in Suva
Temples (LDS Church) in Oceania
The Church of Jesus Christ of Latter-day Saints in Fiji
2000 establishments in Fiji